Cymindis maderae is a species of ground beetle in the subfamily Harpalinae. It was described by Thomas Vernon Wollaston in 1857.

References

maderae
Beetles described in 1857